F.N.B. Corporation (NYSE: FNB) is a diversified financial services corporation based in Pittsburgh, Pennsylvania, and the holding company for its largest subsidiary, First National Bank. As of September 30, 2022, FNB has total assets of nearly $43 billion. FNB's market coverage spans several major metropolitan areas including: Pittsburgh, Pennsylvania; Baltimore, Maryland; Cleveland, Ohio; Washington, D.C.; Charlotte, Raleigh, Durham and the Piedmont Triad (Winston-Salem, Greensboro and High Point) in North Carolina; and Charleston, South Carolina with approximately 340 offices. The company has more than 4,000 employees.

History
First National Bank was founded in Mercer County, Pennsylvania in 1864 under the name The First National Bank of West Greenville and operated out of the house of then Bank President, Samuel P. Johnston, in Greenville, Pennsylvania.  The bank dropped "West" from its name in the 1880s after the town did the same.

The bank remained a fixture in Mercer County through World War I, the Great Depression and World War II. In 1946, bank assets totaled approximately $2 million and the bank was still housed in one office. 

Across the next three decades, the bank continued to grow, and in 1974, FNB Corporation was established as a financial services holding company for a growing family of business entities which included the bank, under the name The First National Bank of Mercer County and with an asset size of $120 million, and Regency Finance Company.

Along with completing the acquisition of ten branch offices from First National Bank of Pennsylvania in July 1992, First National Bank of Mercer County acquired the name and formally changed its name to the current First National Bank of Pennsylvania. Around this time, the First National Bank of Western Pennsylvania in nearby New Castle changed its name to First Western Bank to avoid confusion; that bank is now part of Huntington Bancshares after several other mergers.

As of 2003, the company had grown to assets of $4.6 billion with more than 125 banking offices and began trading common shares on the New York Stock Exchange under the ticker symbol "FNB." Today, it is included in Standard & Poor's MidCap 400 Index with the Global Industry Classification Standard (GICS) Regional Banks Sub-Industry Index.

Current Chief Executive Officer Vincent J. Delie, Jr., joined the bank in 2005 as president of the Pittsburgh Region.  Since then, the company has shown tremendous growth, both organically and through a series of major mergers.

As of 2017, FNB is the second largest bank based in Pennsylvania measured by assets.

Facilities
In July 2014, FNB announced that Pittsburgh had officially been named the corporation's headquarters.  FNB's growth in Pittsburgh has expanded from a single banking office in 1997 to nearly 100 locations and a top three retail deposit market share today. 

In May 2017, FNB announced its regional headquarters would locate in a 22-story building in Raleigh to be called FNB Tower. Groundbreaking took place in December 2017, and the building opened in December 2019.

In March 2018, FNB announced it would anchor a 31-story tower in Charlotte to serve as its regional headquarters. The building was completed and opened in July 2021.

In December 2019, FNB announced it would move its current corporate headquarters operation in the Pittsburgh North Shore to a new 26-story building in downtown Pittsburgh called FNB Financial Center. FNB, the Pittsburgh Penguins, Clay Cove Capital and The Buccini/Pollin Group broke ground on the project on September 1, 2021.

Acquisitions

FNB has acquired many other companies during its long life. Some recent are listed below.

In 2012, FNB acquired Parkvale Savings Bank, which was based in Monroeville.

In 2015, FNB acquired Metro Bank (formerly Commerce Bank) of Harrisburg.

In 2016, FNB agreed to a $1.4 billion deal with Yadkin Financial of Raleigh, North Carolina, the largest deal in the company's history, giving FNB 98 branches in North Carolina. The merger was completed on March 11, 2017.

In 2021, it acquired Howard Bancorp (Howard Bank) of Maryland, and the acquisition was completed on January 22, 2022.

In June 2022, FNB announced the purchase of UB Bancorp of Greenville, North Carolina, with $1.2 billion in assets and 15 Union Bank branches, for stock valued at $117 million. The deal was completed December 12.

Leadership
Vincent J. Delie, Jr., is chairman, president and CEO of FNB Corporation and First National Bank. He joined FNB in 2005 as head of the Pittsburgh Region. Delie became a First National Bank Board member in 2009. In 2011, Delie became president of FNB Corporation and in 2012 he was additionally named chief executive officer and elected to the board of directors. Delie reassumed his role as president of First National Bank when John Williams retired from the position in 2015.

FNB affiliates
FNB Corporation operates several financial services affiliates, including:
 First National Bank of Pennsylvania, its largest subsidiary, with approximately 350 offices across a six-state footprint (as of October 2020)
 First National Trust Company, chartered in 1934
 FNB Investment Services for individuals, corporations, and retirement funds
 FNB Investment Advisors, Inc., a registered investment adviser under the registered Investment Advisers Act of 1940 and with the Securities and Exchange Commission and Pennsylvania Securities Commission
 First National Insurance Agency, offering Property and Casualty, Employee Benefits and Life Insurance coverage

References

External links

Companies listed on the New York Stock Exchange
Banks based in Pennsylvania
Banks established in 1864
Companies based in Pittsburgh
1864 establishments in Pennsylvania